Galopin Des Champs (foaled 12 May 2016) is a French-bred thoroughbred racehorse competing in National Hunt racing. He won the 2023 Cheltenham Gold Cup.

References

External links
  – Galopin Des Champs Race Form

2016 racehorse births
Cheltenham Festival winners
Racehorses trained in Ireland
National Hunt racehorses
Cheltenham_Gold_Cup_winners